Elizabeth Ryan defeated Phyllis Satterthwaite 6–1, 6–0 in the All Comers' Final, but the reigning champion Suzanne Lenglen defeated Ryan 6–2, 6–0 in the Challenge Round to win the Ladies' Singles at the 1921 Wimbledon Championships.

This was the last year that the defending champion received an automatic bye into the final (formally known as the Challenge round).  Beginning in 1922, the defending champion was required to play in the regular Wimbledon draw.

Draw

Challenge round

All comers' finals

Top half

Section 1

Section 2

Bottom half

Section 3

Section 4

References

External links

Women's Singles
Wimbledon Championship by year – Women's singles
Wimbledon Championships - singles
Wimbledon Championships - singles